Asani is a surname. Notable people with the surname include:
 Ali S. Asani (born 1954), Professor of the Practice of Indo-Muslim Languages and Culture at Harvard University
 Suat Aşani (1916–1970), Turkish Olympic fencer
 Xhelil Asani (born 1995), Macedonian footballer

See also 
Cyclone Asani, a 2022 tropical cyclone

Turkish-language surnames